Avon is a city in northeastern Lorain County, Ohio, United States. The population was 24,847 at the 2020 census. It is part of the Cleveland metropolitan area.

History

In the 17th century, what is now Avon, Avon Lake, Bay Village, and Westlake were all once one territory. This territory was inhabited by various Native American tribes, such as the Wyandots, Ottawas, and Eries, who lived in wigwams or simple-stone dwellings. They settled, traded, fought, and later forcibly moved elsewhere.

Township Number 7 in Range 16 of the Western Reserve received its first permanent American settlers during 1814 from Montgomery County, New York, led by Wilbur Cahoon. The township was administered by Dover township and was part of Cuyahoga County. In 1818, Township Number 7 was organized and named "Xeuma", then later renamed "Troy Township". In 1824, Lorain County was created, and the name of Troy Township was changed to Avon Township. An Avon post office was established in 1825.  The entire township was incorporated into a village in 1917, and became the City of Avon in 1961.

Geography

Demographics

2020 census
As of the census of 2020, Avon has a population of 24,847 people and 8,108 households with 2.81 persons per household. In terms of demographics, the population of Avon was 90.5% White, 4.9% African-American, 0.3% Native American, 2.4% Asian-American, 1.4% two or more races, and 2.9% Hispanic or Latino. Of the 24.847 people, 6.4% are under five-years-old, 30.3% are under 18, and 15.3% are 65 years old or older. In terms of gender, the population was recorded as 50.7% female. 96.7% of those residing in Avon who are 25 years old or older are high school graduates or higher and 53.7% of those aged 25 and older have a Bachelor's degree or a higher level of education.

2010 census
As of the census of 2010, 21,193 people, 7,584 households, and 5,750 families resided in the city. The racial makeup of the city was 92.4% White, 2.3% African American, 0.1% Native American, 3.1% Asian, 0.7% from other races, and 1.4% from two or more races. Hispanics or Latinos of any race were 3.4% of the population.

Of the 7,584 households, 42.9% had children under the age of 18 living with them, 65.2% were married couples living together, 7.9% had a female householder with no husband present, 2.7% had a male householder with no wife present, and 24.2% were not families. About 20.6% of all households were made up of individuals, and 8.9% had someone living alone who was 65 years of age or older. The average household size was 2.76 and the average family size was 3.23.

The median age in the city was 38.4 years; 30.5% of residents were under the age of 18; 4.1% were between the ages of 18 and 24; 27.3% were from 25 to 44; 25.4% were from 45 to 64; and 12.6% were 65 years of age or older. The gender makeup of the city was 48.4% male and 51.6% female.

Of the city's population over the age of 25, 49.4% hold a bachelor's degree or higher.

2000 census
As of the census of 2000, 11,446 people, 4,088 households, and 3,143 families lived in the city. The population density was 548.4 people per mi2 (211.8/km2). The 4,291 housing units averaged 205.6 per mi2 (79.4/km2). The racial makeup of the city was 97.02% White, 0.72% African American, 0.17% Native American, 1.03% Asian, 0.24% from other races, and 0.81% from two or more races. Hispanics or Latinos of any race were 1.28% of the population.

Of 4,088 households, 37.9% had children under the age of 18 living with them, 67.7% were married couples living together, 6.4% had a female householder with no husband present, and 23.1% were not families. About 19.7% of all households were made up of individuals, and 6.8% had someone living alone who was 65 years of age or older. The average household size was 2.72 and the average family size was 3.15.

In the city, the population was distributed as 27.6% under the age of 18, 4.7% from 18 to 24, 31.5% from 25 to 44, 23.8% from 45 to 64, and 12.4% who were 65 years of age or older. The median age was 38 years. For every 100 females, there were 94.9 males. For every 100 females age 18 and over, there were 92.6 males.

The median income for a household in the city was $66,747, and for a family was $75,951. Males had a median income of $53,973 versus $31,660 for females. The per capita income for the city was $28,334. About 1.0% of families and 1.9% of the population were below the poverty line, including 0.9% of those under age 18 and 2.5% of those age 65 or over.

Education 
Avon Local School District operates three elementary schools, one middle school, and Avon High School. Avon Middle School was named a Blue Ribbon recipient for 2020 by the United States Department of Education. 

Avon has a public library, a branch of the Lorain Public Library. As of October 2022, this library is under construction to add 16,000 square feet to the existing library after receiving the funds necessary for such an expansion after passing in a levy in May 2020.

Government 
The city typically votes for the Republican Party in federal and state elections. It, along with the rest of the state, continue to trend towards the Republican Party and away from the Democratic Party. In local elections, all candidates run without a party affiliation. Therefore, all city office holders are unaffiliated with a political party.

The city's leadership currently includes:

Notable people
 Al "Bubba" Baker (born 1956), former NFL player
 Gene Hickerson (1935–2008), professional football Hall of Fame
 Luke S. Johnson (1847–1910), Civil War soldier and Michigan state representative
Chris Loschetter (born 1980), professional bowler on the PBA Tour
 Alex Ramirez (born 1974), outfielder for Yomiuri Giants of Nippon Professional Baseball, two-time MVP winner
 Harrison Williams (1873–1953), investor, entrepreneur, and multi-millionaire
 Jack Copeland (born in 1969) Former Football Quarterback for the Arizona Cardinals, and multi-millionaire

Footnotes

References

External links

 City website
 avonhistory.org
 Avon Schools Website

Cities in Ohio
Cities in Lorain County, Ohio
Populated places established in 1814
Cleveland metropolitan area
1814 establishments in Ohio